The Lambretta 48 was a single-seat, 48 cc moped built by Innocenti from 1954. First introduced at the 1954 Milan Show, it was exhibited at Earls Court, London in 1956, and had a two-speed transmission with rear suspension.

The moped market during the 1950s was dominated by the highly successful NSU Quickly, and the Lambretta 48 was withdrawn from the UK market in 1959.

The Lambretta 48 was also produced in India under the name API Lambretta, being assembled in India from kits supplied by parent-business Innocenti in Italy.

Successor

The Lambrettino, an updated design using a rigid spine frame with a coil-sprung single seat and 39 cc (40 x 31 mm) engine, was introduced for the 1966 Model Year. Having a single-speed transmission with automatic (centrifugal) clutch, 18 x 2.00 inch tyres and weighing , the maker claimed a top speed of 24 mph returning an overall fuel consumption of 200 mpg.

Sources

External links

Vehicles introduced in 1954
Mopeds